The following is the list of awards and nominations received by English actor Andy Serkis. For his role as Gollum in The Lord of the Rings film series, he won the Empire Award for Best British Actor, Saturn Award for Best Supporting Actor, and Screen Actors Guild Award for Outstanding Performance by a Cast in a Motion Picture, sharing the latter with the cast.

AACTA Awards

British Academy Film Awards

British Academy Television Awards

British Independent Film Awards

Empire Awards

Golden Globe Awards

MTV Movie & TV Awards

Primetime Emmy Awards

Daytime Emmy Awards

Satellite Awards

Saturn Awards

Film critic awards

Miscellaneous awards

In July 2019, Serkis was awarded the honorary degree of Doctor of Letters (honoris causa) by the University of Lancaster for his role as a leading innovator in CGI and performance capture.

References

Serkis, Andy
Awards